Adrián Otaegui Jaúregui  (born 21 November 1992) is a Spanish professional golfer from San Sebastián who plays on the European Tour where he has won four times. He also played in the inaugural LIV Golf Invitational Series.

Amateur career
Otaegui had a successful amateur career which included winning the 2010 Boys Amateur Championship at Kilmarnock (Barassie) Golf Club where he beat Max Rottluff 4 & 3 in the final.

Professional career
Otaegui turned professional in July 2011. From 2011 to 2013 he played on the Challenge Tour. He had three runner-up finishes in 2013, at the Le Vaudreuil Golf Challenge, the Rolex Trophy and the Kazakhstan Open, finishing 7th in the money list to earn his place on the European Tour for 2014. After a poor 2014, Otaegui regained his place on the European tour by finishing tied for 5th in the 2014 Q School. He lost his card again in 2015 but was joint winner of the 2015 Q School to regain his place for 2016. He had more success in 2016, being runner-up in the Lyoness Open, a stroke behind Wu Ashun, and tied for third place in the Made in Denmark tournament.

In 2017 Otaegui finished tied for 7th in the Open de France after being tied for the lead after 36 holes. Later in 2017 he tied for 5th in the Porsche European Open and then had his first professional win in the Paul Lawrie Matchplay. In the final against Marcel Siem, he was three down after 9 holes but then won six of the next eight holes to win 2&1.

Otaegui  was runner-up in the 2018 Volvo China Open, a stroke behind Alexander Björk and entered the world top-100 for the first time. In his next start he won the Belgian Knockout, beating Benjamin Hébert by 2 shots in the final.

In October 2020, Otaegui won his third title on the European Tour at the Scottish Championship. Having opened the tournament with a ten-under par round of 62, he started the final round four strokes off the lead before closing with a nine-under par 63 to win by four strokes from third round leader Matt Wallace.

In October 2022, Otaegui won the Estrella Damm N.A. Andalucía Masters at Valderrama. He shot a four-round total of 265 (19-under-par), setting a new tournament scoring record. He also beat Joakim Lagergren by six shots.

Amateur wins
2010 Boys Amateur Championship

Professional wins (4)

European Tour wins (4)

Results in major championships
Results not in chronological order before 2019 and in 2020.

CUT = missed the half-way cut
"T" indicates a tie for a place
NT = No tournament due to COVID-19 pandemic

Summary

Most consecutive cuts made – 1
Longest streak of top-10s – 0

Results in World Golf Championships

"T" = tied

Team appearances
Amateur
Junior Ryder Cup (representing Europe): 2008
European Boys' Team Championship (representing Spain): 2009, 2010
Jacques Léglise Trophy (representing continental Europe): 2010 (winners)
Eisenhower Trophy (representing Spain): 2010
European Amateur Team Championship (representing Spain): 2011

Professional
World Cup (representing Spain): 2018
Source:

See also
2011 European Tour Qualifying School graduates
2013 Challenge Tour graduates
2014 European Tour Qualifying School graduates
2015 European Tour Qualifying School graduates

References

External links

Spanish male golfers
Golfers from the Basque Country (autonomous community)
European Tour golfers
LIV Golf players
Sportspeople from San Sebastián
1992 births
Living people